Jeotgalibacillus salarius is a Gram-variable, rod-shaped and motile bacterium from the genus of Jeotgalibacillus which has been isolated from sediments from a marine saltern from the coast of the Yellow Sea in Korea.

References 

Bacillales
Bacteria described in 2010